Large-group capacitation is an adult education and social psychology concept associated with the Brazilian sociologist Clodomir Santos de Morais, and grounded in the "activity" of the individual and the social psychology of the large group. When applied to the context of the Organization Workshop (OW), which, historically, has been used mainly for the purpose of job creation and income generation, it is known as Metodología da Capacitação Massiva (MCM) in Portuguese, Método de Capacitación Masiva (MCM) in Spanish and as Large-Group Capacitation Method (LGCM)  in English.

Coinage 
The English term capacitation is a translation of the latino terms capacitação (Portuguese)/capacitación (Spanish).Capacitation marks the generic difference between transitive and intransitive modes of learning and communicating implicit in de Morais' aphorism se aprende, porém não se capacita (Portuguese) :  "[The trainee] learns, but is not capacitated".  Capacitation, – from capacitação (Portuguese) -, here, is reminiscent of the adult education concept of conscientization – from conscientização (Portuguese) -, popularized by Brazilian theorist, activist and a lifelong friend of Clodomir's, Paulo Freire. While Freire's work was translated into English as early as 1970,
de Morais' Organization Workshop (OW) – and, hence, moraisean large-group capacitation (LGC) – did not come to the attention of the English-speaking public until the mid-80s, when the Chilean Social Psychologists I. & I. Labra moved to Zimbabwe and transferred the method to the (southern) African context. Latino texts were initially translated on an 'ad hoc' basis, including the 'dictionary' translation of capacitación (Spanish) as training (English). Cherrett's 1992 first ever translation into English of de Morais' Apuntes de Teoría de la Organización, also, was still referred to as a "Training" Manual.  
It was not until the ALFA International Conference in Manchester, UK, in 1998, attended by de Morais and academics from four European and four Latin American Universities, that a consensus was reached on the dedicated terms Capacitation and Large Group Capacitation (LGC).

Capacitation in community health, adult education and international development 
Capacitation (outside the field of biology) has been used previously, in English, mainly to emphasize educational content which differs from and/or transcends the basic meaning of the English one-size-fits-all training. In some sectors of Community health, "capacitation" is said to be synonymous with empowering training. Capacitation has also historically been used in the area of adult education, starting with Paulo Freire, who, in the seventies, uses the term "Technical Proficiency Capacitation" to refer to a (n adult) learning activity which can "never be reduced to the level of mere training". In the eighties, Capacitation is defined, by the ILO, as: "availability of opportunities for people to build up their capacities to move from the status of object and passive victims of social processes to the status of subjects guided by self-consciousness and active agents of change". The UNRISD (Geneva) had started (in the seventies) to promote the term capacitation as a "problem-solving, educational" alternative to the then prevalent but mainly pragmatic 'social amelioration' approaches to International development. Jan Nederveen Pieterse contrasts "capacitation"/human development, as proposed by alternative or autonomous (aka self-development) theorists – (such as e.g. Korten, 1990; Max-Neef, 1991; Rahman, 1993 and Carmen, 1996), – with "development-as -economic growth" theorists' for whom, according to Pieterse, capital accumulation is the ultimate Development objective. By the mid-nineties, any mention of capacitation had virtually disappeared from the International Development scene, to be replaced by the World-Bank-sponsored Capacity Building<ref>: "Much of southern development practitioners' capacity enhancing practice is in the transitive vein of providing training courses for on one or another identified "capacity need".</ref>(Capacity) "Building": "To build" means "to form by combining materials or parts". "Capacitation", – on the other hand -, "always involves working with the whole – (i.e. the entire process/activity at the same time) – and not with (a) small part(s) of the system". discourse. Although de Morais worked for many years with a range of UN and International Agencies, his "Activity"-based pedagogy never became common currency there, possibly, as Sobrado suggests, because of, among others, its then presumed "Evil Empire" pedigree.

 Moraisean large-group capacitation (LGC): overview 
The major theoretical influence, acknowledged by de Morais, in the development of the LGC concept and method, is the work of Aleksei N. Leontiev specifically his concept of Objective(ized) Activity which means that, in order to change the mind-set of individuals, we need to start with changes to their activity – and/or to the object that "suggests" their activity. Objective(ized) Activity is at the core of what Labra has referred to as "another" tradition of Social Psychology, namely the Cultural-historical Activity Theory-based branch of Social Psychology, which sets it apart from mainstream (behaviorist/lewinian Social Psychology of small groups. The 'locus' of activity-based LGC is the Organization Workshop(OW), a learning event where participants, applying social division of labor principles, master new organizational knowledge and skills through a learning-by-doing approach. In OW-learning, the trainer's role is merely subsidiary (known as "scaffolding" in Activity Theory). In other words, it is not the trainer/instructor who teaches, but "the object that teaches".The fact that it is the "OW Object" itself that "teaches" does not preclude or exclude the provision of professional training (in the trades, enterprises, services that the participants have chosen to engage in). How 'capacitation' and 'training' go hand in hand is clear, for example, from the diary of a Resource person  (i.e.trainer) at the 1994 Munguine OW in Mozambique. Moraisean capacitation, then..."involves several elements: mastery of a practical experience, perhaps with some theoretical guidance but at least with some theoretical insight; an element in which the object itself guides or influences the subject's understanding in the course of the activity; a process of critical reflection on action and on motives of action. Crucially, it always involves working with the whole and not a small part of the system"''.

History of application 

The insights that gave rise to what came to be known as the moraisean Large Group Capacitation Method (LGCM) were an unanticipated consequence of a 30-day course, in 1954, for a large group  of the Northeast Region, Brazil Peasant Leagues' middle-level leadership to study Brazilian Agrarian reform law. The group met under clandestine conditions at a family home normally accommodating 7 people, in a heavily policed part of Recife (Brazil). Through the early 1960s de Morais staged workshops of an experimental character throughout the northeast of Brazil. After he was forced into exile following the 1964 coup d'état, he worked as ILO Agrarian Reform Regional Advisor for Central America, and later under the auspices of the Food and Agriculture Organization of the United Nations (FAO), he was able to launch a multitude of 'Experimental Laboratories' (later called Organization Workshops in the Southern Africa version of the method).  From 1973 he applied the emerging method to peasants' capacitation within the Agrarian reform Program of Honduras: over three years more than 200 workshops took place, with participation of more than 24000 peasants and government officers from around the region. Over the years de Morais worked as consultant and/or director with the UNDP, FAO, and Catholic Relief Services. Elsewhere the OW has been sponsored by Hivos, Norwegian People's Aid, terre des hommes, Concern Worldwide, Redd Barna and, recently e.g. in South Africa, the Seriti Institute, Soul City Institute and government departments such as South Africa's Department of Social Development. The OW, in a variety of local, regional and national applications, and in different formats, has spread, over the years, to Costa Rica, Mexico, Panamá, Colombia, El Salvador, Honduras, Venezuela, Ecuador, Peru, Nicaragua, Guatemala, Brazil, the Caribbean, a number of African countries as well as Europe.

See also 
  
  
  
   (CHAT)

Publications

Notes and references

External links 
  Kwanda Amsterdam Netherlands, 2015.
  Andersson, Gavin (2013)  "Unbounded Organization" Part 1 Part 2 Gavin Andersson on Kurt Lewin and Lev Vygotsky, 30 May 2013. Part 1 & 2.
 Germinadora Project, 2014. (Spanish)  Capacitacion Masiva y Germinadora 2014 – Large Group Capacitation and the Germinadora Project 2014 – Costa Rica 
  Labra, Iván (2012) (bi-lingual en-es): Consciousness is in the Act
  Labra, Iván (2012) (bi-lingual en-es): The Organization Workshop

Adult education
Cognitive psychology
Learning methods
Social change
Training